The New Wadi es-Sabua is an archaeological site in Egypt.

Created during the International Campaign to Save the Monuments of Nubia, it is located only 4 km west from the original site of Wadi es-Sebua, which today contains three ancient Egyptian temples in Lower Nubia, the temples of Wadi-es Sebua, Maharraqa and Dakka respectively.

Wadi es-Sabua Temple

The Temples of Wadi es-Sebua were erected by the two New Kingdom Egyptian pharaohs, Ramesses II and Amenhotep III. Both temples feature pylons and an inner rock-cut sanctuary. The structures were subsequently moved to a new location in the 1960s due to the construction of the Aswan Dam.

Temple of Maharraqa

The temple of Maharraqa was an ancient Egyptian temple from the Roman period that was never completed.

Temple of Dakka

The Greco-Roman Temple of Dakka, dedicated to Thoth, is today located at the New Wadi es-Sebua area.

References

External links

Archaeological sites in Egypt